Henry Thomas Crocombe (born 20 September 2001) is an English cricketer. He made his first-class debut on 1 August 2020, for Sussex in the 2020 Bob Willis Trophy. He made his Twenty20 debut on 11 June 2021, for Sussex in the 2021 T20 Blast. He made his List A debut on 23 July 2021, for Sussex in the 2021 Royal London One-Day Cup.

References

External links
 

2001 births
Living people
English cricketers
Sussex cricketers
Sportspeople from Eastbourne